Sherida Spitse (born 29 May 1990) is a Dutch footballer who plays as a  midfielder for Ajax and the Netherlands national team.

Club career
Spitse started her career at VV Sneek before joining SC Heerenveen when the Dutch women's professional league (Eredivisie Vrouwen) was established in 2007. After five seasons at Heerenveen where she played 100 official matches and scored 13 goals, in 2012 the Dutch and Belgian leagues merged (BeNe League) and she moved to FC Twente in May 2012. At Twente she won the BeNe League titles in 2012–13 and 2013–14. She was also the club top scorer in 2012–13.

In December 2013, it was announced that Spitse would transfer to Norwegian Toppserien club LSK Kvinner FK from January 2014. For this transfer, money was paid for the first time in Dutch women's football. Spitse became a Norwegian League and Cup champion at the end of the 2014 season with LSK Kvinner. She was also voted on to Norway's Team of the Year at the annual NISO awards ceremony in Oslo. She remained in the club for the next two seasons (2015 and 2016) winning the League and Cup in both seasons.

On 19 December 2016, during the 2015–16 Eredivisie winter break, she moved back to the Netherlands after agreeing a contract with FC Twente to play the second half of the season. On 16 June 2017, she extended her contract with FC Twente for one season.

During the 2017–18 Eredivisie winter break, on 27 December 2017, she signed a two-year contract with Vålerenga Fotball, returning to the Norwegian Toppserien.

On 20 November 2020, it was announced that Spitse had rejoined the Eredivisie this time to join Ajax.

International career
Spitse made her debut for the Netherlands national team under coach Vera Pauw on 31 August 2006, in a 4–0 World Cup qualifying defeat to England. At the time, she was 16 years old and still playing in the VV Sneek boys team.

At the UEFA Women's Euro 2009, she was a member of the Dutch squad which reach the semifinals of the tournament.

In June 2013, national team coach Roger Reijners selected Spitse in the Netherlands squad for UEFA Women's Euro 2013 in Sweden.

On 7 February 2015 she earned her 100th cap for the Dutch against Thailand. Spitse helped the Netherlands qualify for the 2015 FIFA Women's World Cup and was selected for the final squad. She played all four matches in the tournament.

In January 2017, she played her 125th match for the national team against Romania. Spitse was part of the Dutch winning team of the UEFA Women's Euro 2017, playing in all matches and being named in the 2017 UEFA Team of the Tournament. In the 2019 FIFA Women's World Cup, she reached the final with the Netherlands, losing 2–0 to the United States.

Spitse suffered a knee injury in July 2021, forcing her to miss the rescheduled 2020 Tokyo Summer Olympics.

Career statistics
Scores and results list the Netherlands' goal tally first, score column indicates score after each Spitse goal.

Personal life
Spitse and her wife Jolien van der Tuin have two children.

Honours
FC Twente
 BeNe League (2): 2012–13, 2013–14
 Eredivisie (2): 2012–13*, 2013–14*
*During the BeNe League period (2012 to 2015), the highest placed Dutch team is considered as national champion by the Royal Dutch Football Association.

Ajax
 KNVB Women's Cup (1): 2021-22,

LSK Kvinner
 Toppserien: 2014, 2015, 2016
 Norwegian Women's Cup: 2014, 2015, 2016

Vålerenga
 Toppserien: 2020
 Norwegian Women's Cup: 2020

Netherlands
 UEFA European Women's Championship: 2017
 Algarve Cup: 2018

References

External links
 Profile at Onsoranje.nl 
 Profile at onsoranje.nl 
 
 
 
 

1990 births
Living people
People from Sneek
Dutch women's footballers
Netherlands women's international footballers
Expatriate women's footballers in Norway
Dutch expatriate sportspeople in Norway
Eredivisie (women) players
Toppserien players
SC Heerenveen (women) players
FC Twente (women) players
LSK Kvinner FK players
Vålerenga Fotball Damer players
Women's association football midfielders
LGBT association football players
Dutch LGBT sportspeople
FIFA Century Club
2015 FIFA Women's World Cup players
UEFA Women's Championship-winning players
Knights of the Order of Orange-Nassau
2019 FIFA Women's World Cup players
Lesbian sportswomen
Dutch expatriate women's footballers
VV Sneek Wit Zwart players
AFC Ajax (women) players
UEFA Women's Euro 2022 players
Footballers from Friesland
UEFA Women's Euro 2017 players